The International Exhibition of Science, Art & Industry or Edinburgh International Exhibition was held in 1890 between 1 May and 1 November 1890 in Edinburgh to mark the opening of the Forth Bridge one year earlier.

Location
A horse tram route existed that could transport people from the city centre to Meggetland, to the west Edinburgh, almost 3 million people attended but 
the exhibition lost money.

Legacy
The vice chair was Councillor William Joseph Kinloch-Anderson who bought exhibit 299D, a sundial designed by Robert Thomson & Sons masons, and later donated it to the City of Edinburgh when Inverleith Park was opened in 1891.

Souvenirs
Souvenirs included glass tumblers and jugs engraved for the purchaser.

See also
International Exhibition of Industry, Science and Art, similar event in 1886
Edinburgh Exhibition Cup#1890, football matches played during the exhibition

References

1890 in Scotland
1890s in Edinburgh
World's fairs in Edinburgh